Moallem Khani-ye Bala (also Romanized as Mo‘allem Khānī-ye Bālā; also known as Gardaneh-ye Mo‘allem Khānī) is a village in Ilat-e Qaqazan-e Sharqi Rural District, Kuhin District, Qazvin County, Qazvin Province, Iran. At the 2006 census, its population was 22, in 7 families.

References 

Populated places in Qazvin County